Zhang Gensheng (1923–2008) was a People's Republic of China politician. He was born in Anping County, Hengshui, Hebei Province. He was governor of Jilin Province.

References

1923 births
2008 deaths
People's Republic of China politicians from Hebei
Chinese Communist Party politicians from Hebei
Governors of Jilin
Delegates to the 7th National People's Congress